The Joy-Nostalg Center (styled Joy~Nostalg Center), is a mixed-use office and serviced apartment in Ortigas Center, Pasig, Philippines. It houses the headquarters of local and multinational companies while the five-star serviced apartment is operated by AccorHotels, formerly Oakwood Premier. The building is developed and owned by Quantuvis Resources Corporation.

Architecture
The Joy-Nostalg Center was conceptualized and master-planned by Architects Esteban Y. Tan and Gavino L. Tan Partners, while interior design specifics were designed conceptually by Lee Designs (the Interior Design firm of C.Y. Lee & Partners) and executed by Leandro V. Locsin & Partners with the hotel/serviced apartments guided by Oakwood Technical Group from Singapore. The façade and interior design concepts were made in collaboration with the Taiwan-based architectural group of C.Y. Lee & Partners, responsible for the concept behind the former tallest building in the world, the Taipei 101.

The Joy-Nostalg Center is a 40-storey mixed use building, with 16 floors of office space, 23 floors of apartment space, and 6 basement parking levels.

Construction
The excavation works for the building started in December 2006, and structural works started by June 2007. The building was topped off on 20 November 2008, and was completed by the 3rd quarter of 2009. The building, together with its main tenant, the Oakwood Premier, had its soft launching on 1 August 2009, and was formally opened on 9 September 2009.

See also
List of tallest buildings in Metro Manila

References 

Skyscrapers in Ortigas Center
Hotels in Metro Manila
Residential skyscrapers in Metro Manila
Residential buildings completed in 2009
Skyscraper office buildings in Metro Manila
Office buildings completed in 2009
Hotel buildings completed in 2009
Skyscraper hotels in the Philippines
21st-century architecture in the Philippines